Copley Place is an enclosed shopping mall within the mixed-use Copley Square in the Back Bay neighborhood of Boston, Massachusetts. It features direct indoor connections to several nearby destinations including four office towers, and the Boston Marriott Copley Place and Sheraton Boston hotels. The mall is connected to the Prudential Center shopping mall via a skybridge over Huntington Avenue.

The mall currently features Neiman Marcus and Saks Fifth Avenue.  

In November 2019, the online business news website MassLive rated Copley Place as fourth, and the immediately adjacent Prudential Center as fifth best among 40 malls and shopping centers in Massachusetts.

Description
The bi-level indoors mall is noted for its upscale fashion stores, including Ralph Lauren, Christian Dior, John Varvatos, Michael Kors, Tory Burch, Victorinox Swiss Army, Porsche Design, Tiffany & Co., Jimmy Choo, David Yurman, Louis Vuitton, Salvatore Ferragamo, Saint Laurent, Ermenegildo Zegna, Burberry, Furla, and Gucci. Above, the third level provides access to a lobby, reception desk, and the bases of the four office towers.

The mall is connected directly to the Prudential Center shopping mall via a skybridge over Huntington Avenue. Another skybridge connects to the Westin at Copley Place hotel (and a few small shops), by crossing Huntington Avenue at a different location. A Marriott hotel anchors one end of Copley Place, and the Neiman Marcus department store anchors the other end. The mall is also connected to the Back Bay MBTA/Amtrak station via a pedestrian tunnel crossing beneath Dartmouth Street.

The property is managed by Simon Property Group, which acquired it in the 2002 breakup of the then Dutch-owned Urban Shopping Centers, Inc.

History

The structure was the first major project designed by Howard Elkus, then of The Architects' Collaborative. At the time, it was Boston's largest urban mixed-use development project, financed by the Pritzker family of Chicago. It was built in 1983 directly above the Massachusetts Turnpike and Huntington Avenue highway interchange ramps, which had been constructed in 1964 on the site of the former South End Armory. The Armory building had been completed in 1890, and was razed to make room for the Mass Pike right-of-way. Later, as a principal of Elkus Manfredi Architects, Elkus would lead several major renovations of the mall, and a proposed expansion.

In 2011, plans for a  addition of retail space to the facility and a  expansion of its Neiman Marcus anchor were approved by the Boston Redevelopment Authority. By February 2013, the project was awaiting final design plans. In October 2016, Simon Properties announced indefinite postponement of its $500-million project to build a 52-story luxury residential tower, and drastic scaling back of plans to expand the Copley Place mall, citing concerns about rising costs and competition from other Boston luxury towers already under construction.

The artwork was composed of multiple abstract granite and travertine marble shapes, with a waterfall cascading down it into a shallow pool at the bottom, surrounded by marble benches. A proposed renovation which would eliminate the water feature prompted commentary opposing its demolition in 2013. , the fountain had been completely removed, and the location and status of its sculptural components were unknown to the general public.

From its opening, the mall has been marketed as a high-end luxury retail location. Over time, the mix of stores changed in response to sweeping changes affecting the US retailing market. For example, a sizable Rizzoli Bookstore was located opposite the elevators behind the central water feature, but it had closed by the year 2000. Other stores which have moved out include Stoddard's (fine cutlery and personal care tools) and Williams Sonoma (kitchenware and food ingredients). , almost all of the stores sell fashionable clothing, shoes, or accessories.

The mall had also housed one of the few major-chain-owned movie theaters within Boston city limits, but the Loews Copley Place Cinemas was closed in January 2005. It was replaced by Barneys New York men's clothing, which closed in 2019. Barney's became a new Saks Fifth Avenue Men's Store, on August 14, 2020.

Major tenants
Anchors

Restaurants
Legal Sea Foods
Au Bon Pain

Hotels
 Marriott Copley Place
 Westin Copley Place Boston

Offices (in Copley Place Towers)
 The Bridgespan Group is headquartered in 2 Copley Place
 The Boston Regional Office of the US Census Bureau is in Suite 301 of 4 Copley Place. 
 The online furniture retailer Wayfair has its headquarters in 4 Copley Place.
 Canada and Germany maintain Consulates-General for the New England region in Suites 400 and 500, respectively, of 3 Copley Place.

Gallery

References

External links

 Official site

Landmarks in Back Bay, Boston
Simon Property Group
Shopping malls in Massachusetts
Buildings and structures in Boston
Shopping malls established in 1983